Kang Si-ra (Hangul: 강시라), is a South Korean singer. She was a contestant on Produce 101. She released her first EP, Sira, on January 19, 2017.

Discography

Extended plays

Singles

Soundtrack appearances

References

External links

1999 births
Living people
South Korean female idols
Produce 101 contestants
21st-century South Korean women singers